Adrian Cierpka (born 6 January 1995) is a Polish professional footballer who plays as a midfielder for Romanian Liga II side Concordia Chiajna. In his career, Cierpka also played for teams such as Miedź Legnica, Warta Poznań or Górnik Łęczna, among others.

Honours
Górnik Łęczna
II liga: 2019–20

References

External links
 

1995 births
Living people
People from Ostrów Wielkopolski
Polish footballers
Poland youth international footballers
Association football midfielders
Ekstraklasa players
I liga players
II liga players
Liga I players
Liga II players
Lech Poznań players
Miedź Legnica players
Wisła Puławy players
Warta Poznań players
Górnik Łęczna players
CS Mioveni players
CS Concordia Chiajna players
Polish expatriate footballers
Expatriate footballers in Romania
Polish expatriate sportspeople in Romania